Pretty Little Liars is an American teen drama television series.

Pretty Little Liars may also refer to:
 Pretty Little Liars (book series), by Sara Shepard
Pretty Little Liars (franchise), American multimedia teen drama franchise
 Pretty Little Liars (Indonesian TV series), an Indonesian remake of the 2010 US TV series
 Tatlı Küçük Yalancılar, a Turkish remake of the 2010 US TV series Pretty Little Liars